Letopis is a literary genre which was prominent in medieval and early modern Eastern and Central Europe. The most common examples are Rus' chronicles, written in Old East Slavic (and later Ruthenian and Muscovite Russian) about Kievan Rus' and subsequent Rus' principalities and histories. The genre was distributed in Belarus, the Czech lands, Latvia, Lithuania, Poland, Russia, and Ukraine.<ref name="Polenov"></ref>

 Terminology 
The  has given rise to many Slavic derivatives, and was translated into Lithuanian as metraštis. The term letopis is translated into English as 'chronicle'. The record of a particular event in the annals usually begins with the words: "Въ лѣто..." (V lito...), which means "In the year..."; from these words, the terms litopys, letopis  and latopis were derived.

Most of the letopises are author's works, which describe the genealogy and biography of the Old Rus’ian knyazes, the life of the people of Old Rus, and interpret events and signs from an E. Orthodox and eschatological point of view (see “”). It is distinguished from otheral common genres such as "Word", "Life", and Kormchaia.

Letopises, unlike chronicles and annals, contain historical documents, oral traditions (often of a mystical nature), and excerpts from previous chronicles combined with the text of the chronicler himself. The letopis is more of a work of fiction, although it is based on svod (annual record).

 Languages 

Most of the East Slavic letopises are written in Old East Slavic, and known as Rus' chronicles. They originated in Kyivan Rus' and later Ukrainian, Belarusian and Russian lands. Basically, only their dialect differed, depending on their geographical location. Lithuanian letopises are written in Old Ruthenian, Novgorod - in the Old Novgorod dialect, Pskov - in the Pskov dialect, etc. The earliest collections of chronicles stem fro Kyiv and Novgorod, but the first collection of chronicles to be preserved was compiled in the beginning of the 12th century, known as the Primary Chronicle (or Tale of Bygone Years); this influenced many later Rus' chronicles. The Rus' chronicles contain narratives about the settlement of the Eastern Slavs and neighbouring peoples, how the Kyivan state was founded and developed, and its diplomatic relations, society, culture, and religion. The Belarusian-Lithuanian chronicles (such as the Suprasl, Bykhovets, and Barkulabovo chronicles) written in the 14th to 16th centuries were a continuation of the tradition of Rus' chronicles. These Ukrainian litopyses are concerned with the rebellions, society, policies and international relations of the Cossack Hetmanate and the Polish–Lithuanian Commonwealth, and their wars with the Crimean Khanate and Ottoman Empire.

Later, under the influence of the Rus' chronicles, Kazakh letopis appeared, the so-called "shezhire", which differ from ordinary letopises in a more simplified structure and are ordinary pedigrees.

The Old Polish letopis or so-called Polish chronicles were written in Latin; since the 13th century chronicles appeared in Polish. The oldest Polish chronicle written in Latin was Gesta principum Polonorum at the beginning of the 12th century. Maciej Stryjkowski wrote the Chronicle of Poland, Lithuania, Samogitia and all of Ruthenia (1582), generally considered to be the first printed book on the history of the Grand Duchy of Lithuania.

 Purpose of creation 
The writers themselves (singular letopisets) very rarely reported any direct information about themselves or their work, so in most cases, references in the literature to the time, place, and, especially, the purpose of creating letopis monuments are assumptions or the results of reconstruction. Rus' chronicles written from the 12th and 13th centuries onwards were usually produced in monasteries or the at courts of princes and bishops. Later editors were increasingly concerned with compiling and redacting existing writings.

Comparison of letopis texts reveals the presence of their pronounced political orientation and sharp changes in it. Alexey Shakhmatov and his followers, in addition to reconstructing the history of the creation of chronicle vaults, sought to establish the identity and views of their authors, as well as to determine the place of the chronicle in the political struggle of their time. D. S. Likhachev and V. G. Mirzoev, and A. F. Milonov wrote about the educational and didactic tasks of the old Russian letopises.Vladimir Mirzoev Social function of history: According to the "Primary letopis" // Questions of historiography and methodology of history. Rostov-on-Don, 1976. С.8, 16—17. According to the most common opinion, the Russian chronicle is a kind of journalism that has the form of literary and historical works.

According to Igor Danilevsky, the letopises had an eschatological purpose. Since the second half of the XI century, they acquire the function of "books of life", which were supposed to appear at the Last judgment. His arguments, according to Timothy Himon, are indirect, however, The latter does not reject the possibility of an apocalyptic understanding of the letopises, which can be evidenced by the presence of a second, eschatological plan in a number of letopising texts and the very form of the letopis, recording facts from people's lives, as well as information about natural phenomena (signs).

Gimon suggests that the letopises had several goals at the same time: the recording of sacred and unusual events, the appeal of power, and the eschatological purpose of the letopis. The written word enjoyed greater authority than the spoken word in connection with ideas about the sacredness of writing. For this reason, strong political corporations sought to acquire their own letopises in order to ensure their own and their members' future, both in earthly life and at the Last Judgment. The letopis is thus considered as one of the functions of political power.

 Origin 
According to most scholars, the letopises were not originally divided into years, but were a complete prose work. At least this structure had the so-called "Oldest svod", compiled by an unknown author not earlier than the 9th century, and on the basis of which the Kiev-Pechersk monastery was created "Initial vault". In turn, on the basis of the "Initial vault" at the beginning of the 12th century, two of the oldest works that have come down to us are created: the Novgorod First Chronicle and the Tale of Bygone Years.

Dmitry Likhachov, following Nikolay Nikolsky, deduced the beginning of the Rus’ letopis from the West Slavic (Moravian) legends.

Special attention (especially in the northern letopises) was paid to the Old Rus’ knyazes; despite the fact that most of the chronicles were compiled by church people, in many texts the image of the knyaz as a sacred leader was close to pagan, when the knyazes were declared the chosen ones of the gods (Perun or Veles). A special place in the letopis was given to the genealogy of knyazes.

Folk legends and stories were used as sources. Historical distortions were never allowed; according to Shakhmatov, if there were mystical motives or phenomena in the letopis, it was only because the author himself believed in the truthfulness or significance of these events. Often the letopisets inserted an excerpt from another literary work into his work to decorate the text.

 Textual criticism and content 

The number of preserved letopis monuments, according to conditional estimates, is about 5,000.

Most of the letopises in the form of originals have not been preserved, only their copies and partial reworkings (the so-called spisok) created in the XIII-XIX centuries are known. Only in these reworkings were preserved, including the oldest chronicles of the XI-XII centuries. All revised texts are classified by type, (editions), and type. Many parts of the letopis narrative are known as separate works, and the text of the letopis often traces connections from different sources. All these features suggest that the surviving letopises are collections of various materials, many of the original sources of which have not reached our time. This idea, first expressed by Pavel Stroyev, now forms the General opinion. It is now recognized that most of the surviving letopises are collections of previous texts.

The oldest surviving lists (manuscripts) of the letopises are the parchment "The letopisets soon" by patriarch Nikephoros with Rostov news (the last quarter of the XIII century), Synodal list of the Novgorod first letopis of the elder izvod (second half of the XIII century, second quarter of the XIV century), the Laurentian letopis (list of 1377) and the paper Hypatian letopis (1420s). Earlier letopis vaults are reconstructed by scientists based on the study of preserved written monuments.

Each Letopis or letopising svod is considered an independent whole literary work, which has its own structure, intent and ideological orientation.

Many of the most ancient letopises have not reached us. It is known that each principality had its own court letopisetses describing the history of only this principality and defending its views. The fact that in the 15th century there were letopises hostile to the Moscow Principality is proved by the presence in the Pskov Letopises of anti-Moscow judgments and attacks against the Moscow governors. Outright attacks against Moscow are also found in a number of Western Russian Letopises.

As a rule, the letopises tell Russian history from its beginning, sometimes relying on pagan ideas about the creation of the world. New Letopises were often created as collections of previous letopis monuments and various materials (historical tales, lives, Epistles, etc.) and included records of contemporary events. Most Russian letopises contain documents (international agreements, private and public acts), independent literary works ("stories", "words", lives of saints and other hagiographic texts, legends) or their individual fragments, records of folklore origin.
Literary works were often used as historical sources. Many works of old Russian literature have been preserved in the letopis texts: "The teachings of Vladimir Monomakh", "the Legend of the battle of Mamaev", "Walking across the three seas''" by Afanasy Nikitin, etc.

Early history 
The scheme of construction of the oldest Russian chronicle, generally shared by modern scientists, was developed by Alexey Shakhmatov. In Shakhmatov's concept, the initial stage of the Russian chronicle was the "Oldest svod", compiled around 1039 at the Kiev Metropolitan see (Mikhail Priselkov dated its writing to 1037). Presumably, in 1073, this arch was continued and supplemented by the hieromonk of the Kiev-Pechersk monastery, Nikon Pechersky.

It is believed that around 1093–1095, on the basis of the "Oldest svod" and a number of other sources, the Abbot of the Kiev-Pechersk monastery compiled the so-called "Initial svod" (the supposed original title is "Vremennik" ).

According to the scheme of Shakhmatov, a little later, a "Tale of Bygone Years" was created, which was based on the "Initial svod", supplemented by extracts from old Russian written documents, folk legends and materials of the Kiev princely archive (Russian-Byzantine treaties).

Presumably, the original (not preserved) edition of the "Tale of Bygone Years" was created around 1113 by the monk of the Kiev-Pechersk Monastery Nestor (authorship is disputed). In 1116, this chronicle was revised by the abbot of the Kiev Vydubychi Monastery, Sylvester, and its Second edition was created. This second edition (or Sylvester's edition) is preserved as part of the Laurentian letopis. In 1118, the third edition was created by an unknown author on behalf of the Novgorod knyaz Mstislav Vladimirovich (It was preserved as part of the Hypatian letopis). In later letopises, the "Initial svod" and the "Tale of Bygone Years" were often used as a source.

In the 1850s and 1860s, the concept appeared that the Rus’ letopis appeared in the form of annalistic notes, and then underwent a gradual narrativization (this version was supported by Michael Sukhomlinov and Izmail Sreznevsky). Currently, in the works of a number of researchers (Alexey Gippius, Alexey Tolochko), this theory is revived. According to the views of these scientists, the Russian chronicle appeared in Ancient Russia at a very early turn and was conducted in the form of short "svods" (annual records) until the creation of the"Tale of Bygone Years". The annual records were brief, factual, and lacked complex narrative structures. Over time, their accuracy increased, accurate dates appeared, the volume of information increased, the subject matter expanded, narrative inserts and additions were made.

Influence on the genre of Visions 

In many Old Russian letopises, as was noticed by Nikolai Prokofiev and Rosalia Shor, there is a motif of "visions", which is atypical for this historical genre.

Alla Soboleva in her work "The genre of visions in ancient Russian literature" draws attention to the idea of the letopisetses about the creation of the world and their unusual worldview in general. Great attention is drawn to the illustration of the Slavic manuscripts of the "Christian topography" of Cosmas Indicopleustes. Unlike the original, the Old Russian editions are full-fledged reworkings, in which there are also rather strange illustrations that are not related to the content. In the Uvarov and archival editions (created in Novgorod around 1495), in one Thumbnail (conventionally called "the movement of the sun"), the artist depicted his view of the structure of the world: according to his idea, the sun goes underground at sunset. In the center of the miniature is a "world mountain", the meaning of which is not clear. The Uvarov editorial office is the oldest; it is named in honor of Aleksey Uvarov, who opened it. According to Yegor Redin, from the later editions of the Christian Topography, the thumbnail also got into the Old Russian letopises.

Historian Igor Froyanov cites as an example a scene from the Novgorod first letopis and the Tale of Bygone Years, where the Volkhvs (Magi) talk about the creation of man. According to legend, under the year 1071, two Magi appeared in Novgorod and began to sow turmoil, claiming that soon the Dnieper will flow backwards and the land will move from place to place.

In most letopises there are digressions where it is said about the future, describe the strange phenomena that have occurred, and discuss their meaning from a mystical point of view. According to Nikolai Prokofiev, these digressions are "Signs" (the name of a literary genre that existed in ancient Russia), inserted by the author in the text of the chronicle or written by him personally.

Study of sources 
Most scholars (both Russian and foreign) recognize that the letopises are valuable not only as works of art, but also as detailed historical sources. 18th-century philologist Vasily Tatishchev was one of the first to include the letopises in one of the sources for the study of the Old East Slavic and Church Slavonic languages, thanks to which later it was possible to distinguish the morphological and syntactic features of the Old East Slavic language (since the language of Rus' letopises is heterogeneous and the manner of presentation of the northern letopisetses differs from the southern and eastern ones).

Vasily Klyuchevsky used the letopises as a historical source along with the lives of the saints.

The initial period 

The study of the history of Old Russian letopises is one of the most difficult sections of source studies and philology. The study of Old Russian letopises was initiated by Vasily Tatishchev and Mikhail Shcherbatov. Later, their works had a huge impact on the world study of ancient documents, and on the emergence of source studies as a science. Using the method of Tatishchev and Stroev, Mikhail Pogodin discovered a large number of facts about the letopis construction. Mikhail Sukhomlinov ("On the ancient Russian Chronicle as a literary monument", 1856) made an attempt to establish the literary sources of the initial svod. Bestuzhev-Ryumin ("On the composition of Russian Chronicles until the end of the XIV century", 1868) was the first to experience the decomposition of the letopis text into annual records and legends. In general, general preliminary observations were made, the scale of the old Russian letopis and the complexity of its analysis were established.

A new stage in the study of Russian chronicles was opened by Alexey Shakhmatov (1864-1920). His comparative textual method consisted in comparing various lists and in-depth analysis of the text. The scientist sought to find out the circumstances of the creation of each letopis monument and svod, took into account various chronological indications, typos, errors of language and dialectisms. Aleksey Shakhmatov first built the genealogy of almost all the letopis lists, the history of old Russian letopises of the XI—XVI centuries, and at the same time — the picture of the development of Russian social consciousness ("all-Russian letopises of the XIV and XV centuries", 1901; "a Review of Russian letopises of the XIV—XVI centuries", 1938 — Feature all the most significant Russian letopises).

The Soviet period 
Starting with Shakhmatov, the main analysis of the text of the chronicles recognizes the comparison of two or more chronicles throughout their length, and not fragmentary observations. The method of Shakhmatov was developed by Mikhail Priselkov, who placed more emphasis on the historical aspect ("History of Russian Chronicles of the XI—XV centuries", 1940).

Shakhmatov's genealogy was developed and revised by his followers, among whom the greatest contribution to the study of Russian chronicles was made by Nikolai Lavrov, Arseny Nasonov, Lev Cherepnin, Dmitry Likhachev, Sergey Bakhrushin, Alexander Andreev, Mikhail Tikhomirov, Nikolai Nikolsky, Vasily Istrin, etc. Shakhmatov's methodology formed the basis of modern textology. Arseny Nasonov, a disciple of Priselkov, was more active than the latter in making archaeological surveys in the ancient repositories, and discovered a large number of new letopis monuments for science.

In Soviet times, there was an intensification of the study of letopises in connection with the resumption of the activities of the Archaeographic Commission and the publication of the "Complete Collection of Russian Chronicles" on the initiative of Mikhail Tikhomirov.

The modern period 
The study of letopis texts has become widespread in modern Russia and other countries. Among the researchers of the second half of the XX century, the greatest contribution to the study of old Russian letopises was made by I. A. Tikhomirov, D. S. Likhachev, Ya. S. Lurie, V. I. Koretsky, V. I. Buganov, etc.

The study and publication of the Belarusian-Lithuanian letopises were carried out by scientists from Poland (I. Danilovich, S. Smolka, A. Prohaska, S. Ptashitsky, Ya. Yakubovsky, E. Okhmansky), Russia (I. A. Tikhomirov, A. A. Shakhmatov, M. D. Priselkov, V. T. Pashuto, B. N. Florya), Ukraine (M. S. Grushevsky, F. Sushitsky), Belarus (V. A. Chemeritsky, N. N. Ulashchik), Lithuania (M. Yuchas, R. Yasas).

References

Bibliography 
 
 
 
 
 
 
 

7th-century history books
East Slavic chronicles
Old Church Slavonic literature
Christian literature
Slavic history